Statistics of the Scottish Football League in season 1932–33.

Scottish League Division One

Scottish League Division Two

See also
1932–33 in Scottish football

References

 
Scottish Football League seasons